Stephen Kerley (born 25 January 1953) is a former Australian rules footballer who played with Melbourne in the Victorian Football League (VFL).

Notes

External links 

1953 births
Australian rules footballers from Victoria (Australia)
Melbourne Football Club players
Living people